Stéphane Le Foll (born 3 February 1960) is a French politician serving as Mayor of Le Mans since 2018. A member of the Socialist Party, he was Minister of Agriculture under President François Hollande from 2012 to 2017.

Biography

Early political career
Born in Le Mans, Le Foll was elected to the European Parliament for the Socialist Party, part of Party of European Socialists, in 2004. He served until 2012, when he was appointed to the Government of France. While he successfully stood as a candidate for the National Assembly in the 2012 legislative election, he resigned to remain Minister of Agriculture and fellow party member Sylvie Tolmont took the seat.

Minister of Agriculture
As Minister of Agriculture in all governments appointed by François Hollande, he was in charge of reforming the Common Agricultural Policy. He also put an accent on "re-socialising rural territories in France". In 2014, he replaced Najat Vallaud-Belkacem as Government Spokesperson, holding the weekly press briefing at the Élysée Palace. In 2016, he became the longest-serving Minister of Agriculture since the office was established in 1836.

Mayor of Le Mans
He was reelected to the National Assembly in 2017. Le Foll unsuccessfully stood for the leadership of the Socialist Party at the Aubervilliers Congress in 2018. After the death of Jean-Claude Boulard, Le Foll became Mayor of Le Mans. He was succeeded by Tolmont in Parliament, his predecessor.

References

External links

1960 births
Living people
French people of Breton descent
MEPs for West France 2004–2009
MEPs for West France 2009–2014
Socialist Party (France) MEPs
French Ministers of Agriculture
People from Le Mans
University of Nantes alumni
Deputies of the 15th National Assembly of the French Fifth Republic
Mayors of places in Pays de la Loire
Politicians from Pays de la Loire